ASE WeMall is a shopping center in Tucheng District, New Taipei, Taiwan that opened on July 26, 2018. It is the first and largest shopping mall in the district. The main core stores of the mall include Carrefour Market, Showtime Cinemas, Starbucks, Daiso and various themed restaurants. It is located within walking distance of both Tucheng metro station and Haishan metro station.

Floor Guide

See also
 List of tourist attractions in Taiwan

References

External links

2018 establishments in Taiwan
Shopping malls in New Taipei
Shopping malls established in 2018